"Magazine" is the third extended play by Korean American singer Ailee. It was released on September 25, 2014, by YMC Entertainment and Neowiz Internet. Magazine saw Ailee take greater creative control, co-writing four of the album's five songs, including the album's title track; Ailee also collaborated with long-time producer Kim Do-hoon and Korean rap twosome, Dynamic Duo. The song "Don't Touch Me" was used to promote the EP.

Background and release
On September 15, 2014, it was revealed that Ailee will make her comeback on September 25 with her third EP Magazine. A teaser of the singer dressed as a clown with braided pigtails was released on the same day. The singer's agency also revealed that "Magazine" was an album that would present the singer in a matured light. 

In preparation for the album, the singer revealed that she lost 10 kilograms in one month for the album. She stated further that her company did not force her to lose the weight and that they had pushed an originally-scheduled comeback for early 2015 to September 2014. During an interview with After School Club, Ailee revealed Magazine was the hardest she had ever worked on an album; she stated further that she conceptualized Magazine as a whole.

Release 
On September 21, Ailee released the music video teaser for the EP's title track "Don't Touch Me". Two days later on September 23, the EP's album cover was released. On September 25, 2014, Ailee released "Magazine", digitally, as well as the music video for "Don't Touch Me". A comeback showcase was organised for the release of the album at Ilchi Art Hall in Cheongdamdong, Gangnam. "Don't Touch Me" peaked at number two on the Gaon Digital Chart the week of September 27, 2014.

Promotion
Promotions for the album started on September 25, on M Countdown. Ailee also promoted on Music Bank, Music Core and Show Champion, and  Inkigayo in September and October. The singles "Sudden Illness" and "Goodbye Now" were also chosen to be part of her comeback performances.

Track listing

Accolades

Charts

Sales and certifications

Release history

References

External links
 

Ailee EPs
2014 EPs
Dance-pop EPs
Korean-language EPs
Contemporary R&B EPs
YMC Entertainment EPs